The 44th Bombardment Squadron is an inactive United States Air Force unit.  Its last assignment was with the 40th Bombardment Wing, based at Forbes Air Force Base, Kansas.  It was inactivated on 1 September 1964.

Heraldry
Emblem: On and over a blue disc edged in gold a falcon affronte in red, white, and black, outlined in yellow, with wings displayed and carrying a yellow aerial bomb. (Approved 7 February 1942)

History

World War II

Antisubmarine Warfare
Established in Puerto Rico, the unit was activated 1 April 1941 as the 44th Bombardment Squadron (Medium) and assigned to the 40th Bombardment Group (Medium). It trained with borrowed B-18 Bolo medium bombers and slowly received its own equipment.

Following the Japanese Attack on Pearl Harbor, the Squadron was ordered to Panama, and arrived at Balboa, Panama Canal Zone, on 5 June 1942. On 2 July 1942, the unit was redesignated as the 44th Bombardment Squadron (Heavy), following the air echelon's move to Guatemala City Air Base, Guatemala on 23 June. There the unit transitioned onto Boeing B-17E Flying Fortresses and, following familiarization with the much larger and complex aircraft, were almost immediately tasked with antisubmarine patrols duties between Guatemala City and the Galapagos Islands, the third-longest patrol route ever assigned any unit of the Air Corps to that time.

By 7 March 1943, still at Guatemala City, the Squadron had a mix of five B-17Es and three Consolidated B-24D Liberators.  By 11 April, all of the B-17Es were transferred out and replaced by B-24Ds.  The unit was moved to Howard Field, Panama Canal Zone on 19 May 1943 in preparation for its return to the United States, as the need for such a large number of bomber squadrons on the Pacific patrol routes had diminished. The unit left the Sixth Air Force on 15 June 1943.

B-29 Superfortress era
Assigned to Pratt Army Airfield, Kansas in July 1943, being re-manned with new personnel. Received prototype and early production-model Boeing B-29 Superfortress very heavy bombers. Trained under Second Air Force for an extended period due to Boeing technicians making modifications of B-29 aircraft. Deployed to the new XX Bomber Command as part of the 58th Bombardment Wing in the China-Burma-India Theater, flying to bases in India via South Atlantic Transport route; across central Africa, Arabia to Karachi.

From airfields in eastern India, engaged in very long range bombardment raids on Japan.  The squadron participated in the first American Air Force attack on the Japanese Home Islands since the 1942 Doolittle raid on 15/16 June 1944, attacking the Imperial Iron and Steel Works at Yawata on Kyushu by using its forward staging base at Hsinching Airfield (A-1), China, for refueling. Performed a total of nine missions to Japan, also engaged in very long range attacks against enemy targets in Thailand, Manchuria, Borneo, Formosa, Burma, Malaya, Japanese-occupied China, Singapore, Saigon and Cam Rahn Bay, French Indochina.  Also engaged in aerial mining of Japanese-occupied seaports in Thailand Malaya and French Indochina.

Advance of American forces in the Central Pacific though the Northern Mariana Islands made new airfields available within the effective bombing range of Japan.   Moved to West Field on Tinian in April 1945, becoming part of the new XXI Bomber Command.   From the Marianas, engaged in very long range strategic attacks on Japan, its first mission being on 5 May 1945 against the Hiro Naval Aircraft Factory in Kure.   Air attacks over Japan were initially high-altitude daylight bombing missions against industrial, transportation and military targets, largely ineffective due to high upper level winds dispersing bombs over a wide area.   By July, began low-level large area night incendiary raids on urban areas, and dropped mines in Japanese shipping lanes. Continued aerial assaults until the Japanese Capitulation in August 1945, final combat mission taking place on 9/10 August attacking the Hikari Naval Arsenal.

After V-J Day, the squadron dropped food and supplies to Allied prisoners in Japan, Korea, and Formosa, and took part in show-of-force missions.   Demobilized on Tinian in 1946, aircraft being returned to the United States for storage.   Inactivated as a paper unit in October.

Strategic Air Command
Reactivated in 1953 under Strategic Air Command, receiving then second-line B-29s for training and organization.  Replaced the propeller-driven B-29s with new B-47E Stratojet swept-wing medium bombers in 1954, capable of flying at high subsonic speeds and primarily designed for penetrating the airspace of the Soviet Union. In the late 1950s, the B-47 was considered to be reaching obsolescence, and was being phased out of SAC's strategic arsenal. Began sending aircraft to other B-47 wings as replacements in early 1964, being one of the last SAC squadrons equipped with the Stratojet.   Inactivated in September when the last aircraft was retired.

Operations and decorations
 Combat Operations:  Antisubmarine patrols, Dec 1941 – May 1943.  Combat in CBI, 5 June 1944 – 29 March 1945, and Western Pacific, 5 May-14 Aug 1945.
 Campaigns: Antisubmarine, American Theater; India-Burma; Air Offensive, Japan; China Defensive; Western Pacific; Central Burma.
 Decorations: Distinguished Unit Citations:  Yawata, Japan, 20 August 1944; Japan, 5–14 May 1945; Japan, 24 July 1945.

Lineage
 Constituted 44th Bombardment Squadron (Medium) on 22 November 1940
 Activated on 1 April 1941
 Redesignated: 44th Bombardment Squadron (Heavy) on 7 May 1942
 Redesignated: 44th Bombardment Squadron (Very Heavy) on 20 November 1943
 Inactivated on 1 October 1946
 Redesignated 44th Bombardment Squadron (Medium) on g May 1952
 Activated on 28 May 1952
 Inactivated on 1 September 1964

Assignments
 40th Bombardment Group, 1 April 1941 – 1 October 1946
 40th Bombardment Wing, 28 May 1952 – 1 September 1964

Stations

 Borinquen Field, Puerto Rico, 1 April 1941
 Howard Field, Canal Zone, 16 June 1942
 Guatemala City AB, Guatemala, 6 July 1942
 Howard Field, Canal Zone, C. 4–15 June 1943
 Pratt AAF, Kansas, 1 July 1943 – 12 March 1944
 Chakulia AB, India, c. 11 April 1944 – April 1945

 West Field, Tinian, April-7 November 1945
 March Field, California, 27 November 1945
 Davis–Monthan Field, Arizona, c. 13 May-1 October 1946
 Smoky Hill AFB, Kansas, 28 May 1952
 Forbes AFB, Kansas, 20 June 1960 – 1 September 1964

Aircraft

 B-18 Bolo, 1941–1942
 B-17 Flying Fortress, 1942–1944
 B-24 Liberator, 1942–1943
 B-26 Marauder, 1943–1944

 YB-29 Superfortress, 1943–1944
 B-29 Superfortress, 1944–1946; 1953–1954
 B-47 Stratojet, 1954–1964

References

Notes

Sources
 
 Hagedorn, Dan (1995). Alae supra canalem = Wings over the canal: the Sixth Air Force and the Antilles Air Command. Paducah, KY: Turner Pub. Co. 
 Mayborn, Mitch (1971). The Boeing B-29 Superfortress (Aircraft in Profile 101). Leatherhead, UK: Profile Publications (reprint).

External links

Military units and formations established in 1941
044
044